Amanab Rural LLG is a local-level government (LLG) of Sandaun Province, Papua New Guinea. It is located along the border with Keerom Regency, Papua Province, Indonesia.

Kwomtari languages and Senagi languages are spoken in Amanab Rural LLG.

Wards
01. Bibriari (Angor language speakers)
02. Porumun (Angor language speakers)
03. Itomi
04. Mamamura
05. Wahai
06. Kamberatoro (Dera language speakers)
07. Kofiniau
08. Iafar
09. Naineri
10. Wamuru
11. Aheri
12. Amanab Station (Amanab language speakers)
13. Iveig
14. Akraminag
15. Masineri-Nai No. 2
16. Utai
17. Guriaso (Guriaso language speakers)
18. Komtari (Kwomtari language speakers)

References

Local-level governments of Sandaun Province